Suyang station is a metro station on Line 2 of the Fuzhou Metro in Suyang Village, Minhou County, Fuzhou. It is the current western terminus on the line and located on the east of Zhuqi Depot, a depot of the line, and the north of G316 highway. It was opened on April 26, 2019.

Station layout
Suyang station consists one island platform on the basement and a concourse on the ground.

Source:

Exits

References 

Railway stations in China opened in 2019
Fuzhou Metro stations